Dvija Madhab, or Madhabacharya (c. 16th century), was a Bengali poet of the Middle Ages and one of the most significant contributor to Chandimangalkavya tradition of medieval Bengali literature. His work, Sarada Charit, also known as Sarada Mangal Jagaran or Mangalchandir Geet, was probably written in 1579.

Dvija Madhab was born in the Saptagram-Tribeni area of Hooghly, situated in the Sultanate of Bengal. His father Parashar, as mentioned in the Sarada Charit, was a Brahmin. Dvija Madhab is also attributed as the author of Sri Krishna Mangal, another narrative poem popular among the Vaishnavas; but its authorship is doubted by scholars.

The manuscripts of Dvija Madhab's work are found in Chittagong region of modern-day Bangladesh, where the poet probably had migrated from western Bengal in his later years.

References

Bengali male poets
People from Hooghly district
16th-century Bengali poets
Indian male poets
Poets from West Bengal
Bengali Hindus
Bengali-language writers